12A may refer to:

 Media content ratings including the following:
12A issued by the British Board of Film Classification
PG-12, the forerunner to the 12A classification, documented at History of British film certificates
12A issued by the Irish Film Classification Office
12A issued in Malta and Nigeria, documented at Motion picture content rating system
 A type of Mazda Wankel engine
 Any of the several highways numbered 12A